Ellen Arnstad (born 20 September 1965) is a Norwegian magazine editor.

Career
Ellen Arnstad worked as a journalist for the newspaper Akers Avis Groruddalen and the magazines Norsk Ukeblad, Nå and Allers before becoming editor-in-chief of the Norwegian women's magazine Henne in 1994. Since 2000 she also managed the publishing company Allers Familie-Journal. She continued to work in Henne until 2011 when she became editor of Se og Hør.

She is a member of the board of the Association of Norwegian Editors.

References

1965 births
Living people
Norwegian magazine editors
Norwegian women editors
Norwegian journalists
Norwegian women journalists